María Asunción Jacoba Pía de la Concha García-Mauriño, known as Mae de la Concha (born 25 July 1954), is a Spanish bookseller and politician. She is the current regional minister of Agriculture, Fisheries and Food of the government of the Balearic Islands. She was a member of Congress of Deputies from 2016 to 2019. From October 2017 to December 2021 she also served as secretary-general of the Balearic branch of Podemos.

Biography
She started working as a court secretary until 1990, when she founded the La Torre de Papel bookstore. In February 2015 she was elected secretary-general of Podemos Menorca. She was elected to the Congress of Deputies in 2015 and 2016.

References

21st-century Spanish women politicians
1954 births
Living people
Members of the 11th Congress of Deputies (Spain)
Members of the 12th Congress of Deputies (Spain)
People from Gijón
Women members of the Congress of Deputies (Spain)